Sin Eui-hyun (born April 1, 1980) is a South Korean male cross-country skier and biathlete. He is the first South Korean Paralympic competitor to clinch a gold medal in Winter Paralympics as he achieved it in his home nation at the 2018 Winter Paralympics.

Career 
He made his Paralympic debut for South Korea during the 2018 Winter Paralympics and claimed the nation's first Paralympic medal during the 2018 Winter Paralympics after clinching a bronze medal in the men's 20km sitting cross-country skiing event.

Sin Eui-hyun created history after claiming South Korea’s first ever gold medal in their Winter Paralympics history, during the 2018 Winter Paralympics after emerging as the winner of the men's 7.5km classical sitting cross-country skiing event.

He was also selected as the flagbearer for South Korea during the 2018 Winter Paralympics opening ceremony as he represented the home nation, South Korea in the 2018 Winter Paralympics Parade of Nations.

In 2022, he won the silver medal in the men's long-distance sitting cross-country skiing event at the 2021 World Para Snow Sports Championships held in Lillehammer, Norway.

References

External links
  
 

1980 births
Living people
South Korean male biathletes
South Korean male cross-country skiers
Biathletes at the 2018 Winter Paralympics
Cross-country skiers at the 2018 Winter Paralympics
Paralympic cross-country skiers of South Korea
Paralympic biathletes of South Korea
Paralympic gold medalists for South Korea
Paralympic bronze medalists for South Korea
Medalists at the 2018 Winter Paralympics
People from Gongju
Paralympic medalists in cross-country skiing
Sportspeople from South Chungcheong Province
20th-century South Korean people
21st-century South Korean people